Laroi is a village into the town of Bhogpur in district Jalandhar of Punjab, India. Laroi is a village that is home to many communities and castes such as Hindus, Brahmins, Sikh Jatts, Lubanas, Khatris, Adharmis and others. The main profession here is agriculture, farming, and jobs in the public sector. Most of the families in this village have one or more members who have migrated to Western countries for better jobs.

Location
Laroi is located less than 1 kilometre from Jalandhar-Pathankot road.

Laroi has 4 Sikh Gurdwaras, 3 Hindu Temples and one Muslim place called jahar peer.

The current leader of village is soda sarpanch . Laroi is a clean village but could be cleaner as it lacks proper drainage system. The  new sarpanch  is doing well but the task is massive .

the youth here plays mainly the kabbadi game and most of the youth here goes to the gym .
00

References

Villages in Jalandhar district